Boiruna sertaneja is a species of snake in the family Colubridae. The species can be found in Brazil.

References 

Mussuranas
Boiruna
Endemic fauna of Bolivia
Reptiles of Brazil
Reptiles described in 1996